Qasrik-e Olya (also Romanized as Qaşrīk-e ‘Olyā; also known as Qasrīk and Qaşrīk) is a village in Shepiran Rural District, Kuhsar District, Salmas County, West Azerbaijan Province, Iran. At the 2006 census, its population was 231, in 35 families.

References 

Populated places in Salmas County